Arthur Allister (Al) MacBain (4 September 1925 – 3 April 2003) was a Canadian lawyer and politician. McBain was a Liberal party member of the House of Commons of Canada. He was born in New Glasgow, Nova Scotia and became a barrister by career after graduating from Dalhousie University.

He represented Ontario's Niagara Falls electoral district in the 32nd Canadian Parliament after winning that riding in the 1980 federal election. MacBain left national politics after his defeat in the 1984 federal election.

External links
 
   (p. 27)
  Tributes to Al MacBain.

1925 births
2003 deaths
Dalhousie University alumni
Liberal Party of Canada MPs
Members of the House of Commons of Canada from Ontario
People from New Glasgow, Nova Scotia